Common names: ocellated earth snake, ocellated shieldtail, Nilgiri uropeltis.
Uropeltis ocellata is a species of non-venomous shieldtail snake in the family Uropeltidae. The species is indigenous to southern India. There are no subspecies that are recognized as being valid.

Description
The following description of U. ocellata is from Beddome, 1864: "rostral pointed and much produced; nasal scutella meeting behind the rostral, and separating it from the [pre]frontals; eye very small, obscure, in [the] front of [the] ocular shield; other shields and labials as in the genus; scales round the neck in 18 rows, round the trunk in 17; caudal disk not very clearly defined; scales 2-5-keeled; terminal shield entire, or slightly 2-3-pronged; abdominals 199; subcaudals 8 or 10 pairs, some generally entire. Total length . Colour of the body of the male yellowish, becoming gradually brown near the head and tail, of the female dull brownish, of the young dark purplish brown; all banded with transverse rows of four or five black-edged white or yellow spots (like eyes), generally rather irregularly placed. Sides of the belly with transverse, very irregular shaped, yellow or white blotches, rarely meeting over the abdominals, and forming a transverse band."

Rostral about ¼ the length of the shielded part of the head. Portion of the rostral visible from above longer than its distance from the frontal. Frontal usually longer than broad. Eye very small, its diameter slightly less than ⅓ the length of the ocular shield. Diameter of body 30 to 46 times in the total length. Ventrals about two times as large as the contiguous scales. Tail rounded or slightly flattened.

Geographic range
U. ocellata is found in southern India in the Western Ghats: south of the Goa Gap, Anaimalai, Cardamom (southern Kerala), Munnar Hills, Nilgiri Hills and Trivandrum. The type locality given is "at Walaghat on the western slopes of the Neilgherries in the dense forests at an elevation of 3,500 feet" (1,067 m).

Habitat

Behaviour
U. ocellata is terrestrial and fossorial.

Diet
U. ocellata preys predominately upon earthworms.

Reproduction
U. ocellata is ovoviviparous. Adult females have been observed to be gravid in July.

References

Further reading

Beddome, R.H. (1863). "Descriptions of New Species of the Family Uropeltidæ from Southern India, with Notes on other little-known Species". Proceedings of the Zoological Society of London 1863: 225–229 + Plates XXV–XXVII. (Silybura ocellata, new species, p. 226).
Beddome, R.H. (1863). "Further notes upon the snakes of the Madras Presidency; with some descriptions of new species". Madras Quarterly Journal of Medical Science 6: 41–48. [Reprint: J. Soc. Bibliogr. Nat. Sci., London 1 (10): 306–314, 1940].
Beddome, R.H. (1878). "Description of six new Species of Snakes of the Genus Silybura, Family Uropeltidæ, from the Peninsula of India". Proc. Zool. Soc. London 1878: 800–802. (Silybura dupeni, new species, p. 801; S. ochracea, new species, p. 801).
Beddome, R.H. (1886). "An Account of the Earth-Snakes of the Peninsula of India and Ceylon". Annals and Magazine of Natural History, Fifth Series 17: 3–33.
Boulenger, G.A. (1890). The Fauna of British India, Including Ceylon and Burma. Reptilia and Batrachia. London: Secretary of State for India in Council. (Taylor and Francis, printers). xviii + 541 pp. (Silybura ocellata, pp. 262–263, Figure 82).
Günther, A.C.L.G. (1864). The Reptiles of British India. London: The Ray Society. (Taylor and Francis, printers). xxvii + 452 p. + Plates I–XXVI. (Silybura ocellata, p. 190 + Plate XVII, figure E [four views]).
Rajendran, M.V. (1979). "Uropeltis ocellatus Beddome: morphology, ecology and distribution. Recording two subspecies U. ocellatus gansi and U. ocellatus krishnasami ". Journal of Madurai Kamaraj University, Series B Sciences 8 (1): 97–99.
Sharma, R.C. (2003). Handbook: Indian Snakes. Kolkata: Zoological Survey of India. 292 pp. .
Smith, M.A. (1943). The Fauna of British India, Ceylon and Burma, Including the Whole of the Indo-Chinese Sub-region. Reptilia and Amphibia. Vol. III.—Serpentes. London: Secretary of State for India. (Taylor and Francis, printers). xii + 583 pp. (Uropeltis ocellatus, new combination, pp. 76–77, Figure 24).
Whitaker, R.; Captain, A. (2008). Snakes of India: The Field Guide. Chennai: Draco Books. 495 pp. .

External links
 

Uropeltidae
Reptiles of India
Endemic fauna of the Western Ghats
Reptiles described in 1863
Taxa named by Richard Henry Beddome